Seth Grove (born September 14, 1979) was first elected to the Pennsylvania House of Representatives in November 2008. Grove is a member of the Republican Party.

Politics
Prior to his election, Grove served as a legislative assistant for Congressman Todd Platts and Representative Stan Saylor, and as a chief of staff for Representative Keith J. Gillespie. He has been a representative in the Pennsylvania House of Representatives since 2009.

In 2021, Grove authored a bill to overhaul Pennsylvania's elections.

Personal
Grove attended York College and graduated with a degree in public administration.  He and his wife live in Dover.

References

External links
State Representative Seth Grove official caucus website
Seth Grove (R) official PA House website

Republican Party members of the Pennsylvania House of Representatives
Living people
York College of Pennsylvania alumni
1979 births
21st-century American politicians